ICSW can stand for:
 Institute for Clinical Social Work, an independent educational institution in Chicago, Illinois
 Interdepartmental Committee on the Status of Women, a US government agency established in 1963
 International Committee on Seafarers Welfare (1973–2013), an organization now merged into the International Seafarers' Welfare and Assistance Network
 Inverse Compliance Score Weighting, a method of reweighting associated with the Local average treatment effect
 International Council on Social Welfare, an international organization
 Iowa Commission on the Status of Women